The Golden Coach is a coach owned and used by the Dutch royal family. The Gold Coach was used every year to carry the Dutch monarch from the Noordeinde Palace to the Ridderzaal in order to deliver the Speech from the Throne or the wedding of the Prince of Orange or the Princess of Orange.

Composition
   
The coach is made of teak wood, much of which is covered in gold leaf. It is decorated with paintings by Nicolaas van der Waay and various symbolic ornaments. The coach was built in Dutch Renaissance style. It is pulled by eight horses when the reigning monarch is being carried; only six horses when other members of the royal family are travelling in the coach. Queen Wilhelmina wanted to be able to stand upright in the coach, which explains the bent form of the coach's roof. This increased height of the coach has made it more difficult to drive.

History
Queen Wilhelmina received the Gold Coach at her 1898 investiture as a tribute from the citizens of Amsterdam. The coach was designed and built by the Spijker brothers. Because Queen Wilhelmina wished not to receive gifts on the day of her inauguration on September 6, 1898, she actually took receipt of the Golden Coach the following day.

The vehicle was first used on the occasion of the marriage of Queen Wilhelmina and Prince Hendrik on February 7, 1901. Since 1903 it has mainly been used once a year, in The Hague, on the third Tuesday in September, Prinsjesdag, on the occasion of the Monarch's Address. In 1974 however the coach was not used for security reasons, due to the French Embassy siege.

Other occasions when the carriage has been used are:
 the wedding of Princess Juliana and Prince Bernhard (The Hague, 1937)
 the baptism of Princess Beatrix (1938)
 the inauguration of Queen Juliana (Amsterdam, 1948)
 the wedding of Princess Beatrix of the Netherlands and Claus van Amsberg (Amsterdam, 1966)
 the wedding of Willem-Alexander, Prince of Orange, and Máxima Zorreguieta Cerruti (Amsterdam, 2002)

At the wedding of Willem-Alexander and Máxima someone threw some white paint to the coach. He was immediately arrested, while the stuff was quickly wiped away by a footman. On Prinsjesdag in 2010 a man threw a tea light holder against the Golden Coach, causing minor scratches to the paintwork. Convicted of insulting the Queen, damaging the Golden Coach, and assaulting the coach's footmen, the man — who was found to be mentally incapable, excluding jail time — was sentenced to a year in a psychiatric clinic.

In September 2015, it was announced that the coach would undergo a major refit for the next three to four years and that the "Glass Coach" would be used where the Golden Coach would be normally used.

In September 2022, following tests on a sample taken during the coach's restoration, it was confirmed that the gold used to line the coach came from Suriname.

Controversy
In 2011, MPs Harry van Bommel and Mariko Peters suggested removing the left panel, portraying Hulde der Koloniën (Tribute from the colonies). According to activists, the panel showed half-naked slaves making gestures of submission to the royal house. Historians, on the other hand, stated that the scene does not depict slaves or the  royal family, nor is it a glorification of the colonies. The panel shows the relations with the colonies at that point and, according to historian Susan Legêne of the Vrije Universiteit Amsterdam, refers to the discussion about the Dutch Ethical Policy that focused on a moral vocation that the Netherlands should feel towards the people in the colonies.

After the Golden Coach was renovated, it was displayed in a glass box on the courtyard of the Amsterdam Museum from June until November 2021. In six surrounding halls were expositions of the history of the Golden Coach. There was also a study room for debate.

On 13 January 2022, King Willem-Alexander announced that he would not ride in the coach until all citizens feel they are equal and given fair opportunities.

References

Royal carriages
Dutch monarchy
Spyker
1898 in transport
Vehicles of the Netherlands
Material culture of royal courts